This is a list of American Samoa territorial symbols:

Other symbols

 The fue, To'oto'o (staff) and Tanoa (kava bowl), featured on the Seal of American Samoa and on the American Samoa quarter
Fatu Rock
Samoa 'ava ceremony

See also
Governors of American Samoa

References

symbols